Events from the year 2007 in Albania.

Incumbents
 President: Alfred Moisiu (until 24 July), Bamir Topi (starting 24 July)
 Prime Minister: Sali Berisha

Events

January

February

March

March 10: Yearlong talks on the future of Kosovo end in stalemate between the Serbian Government and the ethnic Albanian leaders of the province.

April

May

June

July

July 11: The Organisation for the Prohibition of Chemical Weapons confirmed the destruction of the entire chemical weapons stockpile in Albania.
July 24: Republic of Macedonia, Albania and Serbian autonomous province of Kosovo are experiencing blackouts as a result of the 2007 European heatwave that spreads over the Balkans.  It also causes bushfires everywhere in the region between Croatia, Hungary, Serbia and Greece.

August

September

October

November

November 7: Four Albanian militants are killed in a Macedonian police operation.

December

Deaths

See also
 2007 in Albanian television

References